KWUF (1400 AM, The Wolf) is a radio station broadcasting a country music music format.  Licensed to Pagosa Springs, Colorado, United States, the station is currently owned by Wolf Creek Broadcasting, LLC and features programming from CNN Radio and Westwood One.

References

External links
 

WUF